Iziaslav Vladimirovich may refer to:

 Izyaslav of Polotsk (reigned 989–1001), the son of Vladimir I of Kiev and Rogneda of Polotsk
 Iziaslav IV Vladimirovich (born 1186)

See also 
 Iziaslav (disambiguation)